Giani Stuparich (April 4, 1891 – April 7, 1961) was an Italian writer. He was born in Trieste, then in the Austrian-Hungarian Empire. In 1948 he won a gold medal in the art competitions of the Olympic Games for his "La Grotta" ("The Cave").

References

External links
 
 profile

1891 births
1961 deaths
Italian male writers
Olympic gold medalists in art competitions
Medalists at the 1948 Summer Olympics
Olympic competitors in art competitions